Tylanthes is a monotypic moth genus in the subfamily Arctiinae. Its only species, Tylanthes ptochias, is found in Australia and New Guinea. It is found in both lowland and highland habitats. Both the genus and species were first described by Edward Meyrick in 1889.

References

Moths described in 1889
Lithosiina
Monotypic moth genera